Bjørn Odmar Andersen (14 March 1943 – 4 January 2008) was a Norwegian footballer who played for Ørn-Horten, Brann and Strømsgodset. His position on the pitch was winger. Born in Horten, Andersen joined Brann in 1963, while serving his military service at the Haakonsvern naval base near Bergen, and was part of the Brann team that won the Norwegian league title in 1963. Andersen spent two seasons at Brann, and later joined Strømsgodset where he won a second League title in 1970, as well as the Norwegian Cup in 1969, 1970 and 1973. He also won 10 caps for Norway. He managed Strømsgodset IF in 1985.

References

External links
 Obituary 
 Obituary of Bjørn Odmar Andersen at the official club site of Ørn-Horten 

1943 births
2008 deaths
People from Horten
Norwegian footballers
Norway international footballers
FK Ørn-Horten players
SK Brann players
Strømsgodset Toppfotball players
Eliteserien players
Norwegian football managers
Strømsgodset Toppfotball managers
Association football midfielders
Sportspeople from Vestfold og Telemark